Fritjof Capra (born February 1, 1939) is an Austrian-born American physicist, systems theorist and deep ecologist. In 1995, he became a founding director of the Center for Ecoliteracy in Berkeley, California. He is on the faculty of Schumacher College.

Capra is the author of several books, including The Tao of Physics (1975), The Turning Point (1982), Uncommon Wisdom (1988), The Web of Life (1996), and The Hidden Connections (2002), and co-author of The Systems View of Life (2014).

Life and work 
Born in Vienna, Austria, Capra attended the University of Vienna, where he earned his PhD in theoretical physics in 1966. He conducted research in particle physics and systems theory at the University of Paris (1966–1968), the University of California, Santa Cruz (1968–1970), the Stanford Linear Accelerator Center (1970), Imperial College, London (1971–1974) and the Lawrence Berkeley Laboratory (1975–1988). While at Berkeley, he was a member of the Fundamental Fysiks Group, founded in May 1975 by Elizabeth Rauscher and George Weissmann, which met weekly to discuss philosophy and quantum physics. He also taught at U.C. Santa Cruz, U.C. Berkeley, and San Francisco State University.

He has written popular books on the implications of science, notably The Tao of Physics, subtitled An Exploration of the Parallels Between Modern Physics and Eastern Mysticism. The Tao of Physics asserts that both physics and metaphysics lead inexorably to the same knowledge. After touring Germany in the early 1980s, Capra co-wrote Green Politics with author Charlene Spretnak in 1984.

He is fluent in German, English, French and Italian.

Capra contributed to the screenplay for the 1990 movie Mindwalk, starring Liv Ullmann, Sam Waterston and John Heard. The film is loosely based on his book, The Turning Point.

In 1991 Capra co-authored Belonging to the Universe with David Steindl-Rast, a Benedictine monk. Using Thomas Kuhn's The Structure of Scientific Revolutions as a stepping stone, the book explores parallels between new paradigm thinking in science and in  religion; the authors posit that, together, these new paradigms offer remarkably compatible views about the universe.

Capra advocates that Western culture abandon conventional linear thought and the mechanistic views of Descartes. Critiquing the reductionistic Cartesian view that everything can be studied in parts to understand the whole, he encourages a holistic approach. In The Web of Life, Capra focuses on systemic information generated by the relationships among all parts as a significant additional factor in understanding the  character of the whole, emphasizing the web-like structure of all systems and the interconnectedness of all parts.

He is a founding director of the Center for Ecoliteracy located in Berkeley, California, which promotes ecology and systems thinking in primary and secondary education.

Capra is an Earth Charter International Council member.

Bibliography 

 The Tao of Physics: An Exploration of the Parallels Between Modern Physics and Eastern Mysticism (1975), Capra's first book, challenges conventional wisdom by demonstrating striking parallels between Vedic and Oriental mystical traditions and the discoveries of 20th century physics. Originally published by a small publisher with no budget for promotion, the book became a bestseller by word of mouth until it was picked up by a major American publishing house. It has now been published in 43 editions in 23 languages.
 The Turning Point: Science, Society, and the Rising Culture (1982) explains perceived scientific and economic crises. It begins by outlining and tracing the history of science and economics, highlighting the flaws in the Cartesian, Newtonian, and reductionist paradigms. It explains how such viewpoints have grown inadequate for modern technology and ecology needs, then argues that science needs to develop the concepts and insights of holism and systems theory to solve society's complex problems.
 Green Politics (1984), co-authored with Charlene Spretnak, analyzes the rise of the Green Party in Germany and similar ecology-oriented political parties in other European countries. It has been published in 7 editions in 4 languages.
 Uncommon Wisdom (1988) describes dialogues and personal encounters between himself and the thinkers who helped to shape the theme of The Turning Point. It has been published in 16 editions and 12 languages.
 Belonging to the Universe: Explorations on the Frontiers of Science and Spirituality (1993) was coauthored with David Steindl-Rast and Thomas Matus. The book explores parallels between ways of thinking in science and Christian theology. It has been published in 10 editions in 7 languages.
 The Web of Life: A New Scientific Understanding of Living Systems (1996) starts from the conceptual framework presented in The Turning Point, summarizes the mathematics of complexity, and offers a synthesis of recent nonlinear theories of living systems that have dramatically increased our understanding of the key characteristics of life. Capra makes extensive reference to the work of Humberto Maturana, Francisco Varela, Ilya Prigogine, Gregory Bateson and others in proposing a new, systems-based scientific approach for describing the interrelationships and interdependence of psychological, biological, physical, social, and cultural phenomena. The book has been published in 14 editions in 10 languages.
 The Hidden Connections (2002) extends the framework of systems and complexity theory to the social domain and uses the extended framework to discuss some of the critical issues of our time.
 The Science of Leonardo: Inside the Mind of the Great Genius of the Renaissance (2007). Its central idea is that Leonardo da Vinci's science is a science of living forms, of quality, which can be seen as a distant forerunner of today's complexity and systems theories. The book has been published in 7 editions in 5 languages.
 Learning from Leonardo: Decoding the Notebooks of a Genius (2013), offers a glimpse into the works of the prescient thinker, Leonardo da Vinci, whose pioneering genius contributed to many scientific fields. 
 The Systems View of Life (2014), co-authored with Pier Luigi Luisi, offers radical solutions to twenty-first century challenges by focusing on the connected world and examining life through its inextricably linked systems.
 Patterns of Connection. Essential essays from five decades (2021) is a personal account of the author's intellectual journey, documented by a series of essays together with extensive commentaries that interweave the essays and provide historical and philosophical context.

See also
Arne Næss
Center for Ecoliteracy
Da Vinci Medallion
Deep Ecology
Ecoliteracy
Ervin Laszlo
Gaia hypothesis
Gregory Bateson
Hindu idealism
Holism
Systems theory

References

External links

Official website
The Turning Point
Home on the web for the Center for Ecoliteracy
Interview with Fritjof Capra by Francis Pisani

20th-century American physicists
21st-century American physicists
Austrian physicists
Particle physicists
Systems scientists
Deep ecologists
Ecophilosophers
New Age writers
Writers about religion and science
American science writers
American spiritual writers
Leonardo da Vinci scholars
Writers from the San Francisco Bay Area
American Book Award winners
Scientists from Vienna
1939 births
Living people
Philosophical cosmologists
Quantum mysticism advocates